Shahrak-e Mehdi (also Romanized as Shahrak-e Mehdī) is a village in Almahdi Rural District, Mohammadyar District, Naqadeh County, West Azerbaijan Province, Iran. At the 2006 census, its population was 689, in 168 families.

References 

Populated places in Naqadeh County